László Burján (born 12 March 1985) is a Hungarian judoka.

Achievements

External links
 
 

1985 births
Living people
Hungarian male judoka
Judoka at the 2004 Summer Olympics
Olympic judoka of Hungary
21st-century Hungarian people